The Rural Revival Party is a former political party in Ukraine; the party merged into the (then) new party United Left and Peasants in December 2011.

History
The party was registered in May 1993 under the name Party of free peasants. In March 1994, it changed to Party of free peasants and entrepreneurs of Ukraine After an unsuccessful political campaign in the 1994 parliamentary election, it did not participate in the 1998 and 2002 elections.

In the parliamentary elections of 26 March 2006, the party was part of the Ukrainian National Bloc of Kostenko and Plyushch which failed to win  parliamentary seats. After this election, the party changed its name to Rural Revival Party.

In the 30 September 2007 elections, the party failed as part of the Peasants' Bloc "Agrarian Ukraine" to win parliamentary representation.

In 2011, the party dissolved. Its former members joined the United Left and Peasants.

References

External links
 Hai-Nyzhnyk, P. Rural Revival Party. Encyclopedic handbook. Kiev 2012
 Databases ASD: Political parties in Ukraine

Agrarian parties in Ukraine
Political parties established in 1993
Political parties disestablished in 2011
Defunct political parties in Ukraine
1993 establishments in Ukraine